The New Age of DC Heroes (originally titled as Dark Matter) is a comic book line published by DC Comics from 2018 to 2020. The titles – Damage, The Silencer, Sideways, The Terrifics, The Curse of Brimstone, The Immortal Men, New Challengers, and The Unexpected – were set in the DC Universe following the events of Dark Nights: Metal. The line was considered a commercial failure.

Publication history
In 2016, the Dark Matter line was announced alongside The Sandman Universe, with both comic lines to be set in the DC Universe after Dark Nights: Metal, featuring new characters alongside re-imagined versions of old ones from DC Comics. In 2017, Dark Matter was rebranded as "The New Age of DC Heroes". As of July 2019, all of the constituent series had been cancelled except The Terrifics, which continued until 2020, with its last three issues published digital-only, during the COVID-19 pandemic.

List of titles

Damage
 Written by: Robert Venditti
 Drawn by: Tony S. Daniel
 Schedule: January 18, 2018 – April 17, 2019
 Issues: #1–16 (plus 1 annual)
Ethan Avery is a soldier who submits to an experiment that turns him into a monster, Damage, leading him to question everything he believed about his cause.

The Silencer
 Written by: Dan Abnett
 Drawn by: John Romita Jr.
 Schedule: February 1, 2018 – June 26, 2019
 Issues: #1–18 (plus 1 annual)
Honor Guest is a retired assassin who is targeted by her former employers, Leviathan.

Sideways

 Written by: Dan DiDio and Justin Jordan
 Drawn by: Kenneth Rocafort
 Schedule: February 15, 2018 – February 27, 2019
 Issues: #1–13 (plus 1 annual)
Derek James gains the abilities to travel across dimensions.

The Terrifics
 Written by: Jeff Lemire
 Drawn by: Ivan Reis
 Schedule: March 1, 2018 – September 1, 2020
 Issues: #1–30 (plus 1 annual)
Mister Terrific, Metamorpho, Plastic Man and Phantom Girl join forces to escape the Dark Multiverse.

The Curse of Brimstone
 Written by: Justin Jordan
 Drawn by: Philip Tan
 Schedule: April 4, 2018 – March 7, 2019
 Issues: #1-12 (plus 1 annual)
In order to protect his hometown, Joe Chamberlain makes a deal with the demon Brimstone, but Joe must track down and destroy Brimstone before the power he now wields destroys the town he was trying to save.

The Immortal Men
 Written by: James Tynion IV
 Drawn by: Jim Lee
 Schedule: April 11 – September 14, 2018
 Issues: #1–6
Led by the Immortal Man, they are a team of immortal heroes who protected the world from an ancient threat.

New Challengers
 Written by: Scott Snyder and Aaron Gillespie
 Drawn by: Andy Kubert
 Schedule: May 16 – October 17, 2018
 Issues: #1–6
As the New Challengers, five misfit strangers are given a second chance at life, but only if they obey the orders of the mysterious Professor and execute deadly missions in the most unexplored corners of the multiverse.

The Unexpected

 Written by: Steve Orlando
 Drawn by: Ryan Sook
 Schedule: June 6, 2018 – January 9, 2019
 Issues: #1–8
Janet Fals, alias Firebrand, is a former paramedic who is forced to feed the Conflict Engine inside her heart by starting a fight every 24 hours.

See also
 Dark Nights: Metal
 The Sandman Universe by Vertigo Comics

References

External links
 The New Age of DC Heroes by DC Entertainment

2018 comics debuts
2019 comics endings